

Events
 Romulus, first king of Rome, celebrates the first Roman triumph after his victory over the Caeninenses, following the Rape of the Sabine Women.  He celebrates a further triumph later in the year over the Antemnates.
 Rome's first colonies were established.
 Diocles of Messenia won the seventh Ancient Olympic Games.
 (or 745 BC) Menahem succeeds Shallum of Israel as king of the ancient Kingdom of Israel.
 Piye succeeds Kashta as Kushite king, and conquers Egypt founding the Twenty-fifth Dynasty of Egypt.
 Visakhayupa succeeds Palaka as emperor of Magadha.

Births
 Dionysius of Halicarnassus dates the foundation of Rome to 752 BC/2 AUC (traditional date: 21 April 753 BC): "Romulus, the first ruler of the city, began his reign in the first year of the seventh Olympiad, when Charops at Athens was in the first year of his ten-year term as archon."

Deaths
 Zechariah of Israel, king of the northern Israelite Kingdom of Israel, and son of Jeroboam II.
 Alara of Nubia, king of Kush.

References

750s BC